This is a list of airports in Nigeria, grouped by type and sorted by location.

Nigeria has 32 airports, 26 of which are operated by the Federal Airports Authority of Nigeria (FAAN), and five of which are functional international airports. It also has a state-owned airport located in Akwa Ibom State. In addition, there are airstrips or airfields scattered around the country, built mainly by the Nigerian Air Force and multinational oil companies. Nigeria has only one private-public partnership airport, operated by Bi-Courtney Aviation Services Ltd - Murtala Muhammed Airport Two.



Airports 

Airport names shown in bold have scheduled passenger service on commercial airlines.

See also 
 Transport in Nigeria
 List of airports by ICAO code: D#DN - Nigeria
 Wikipedia: WikiProject Aviation/Airline destination lists: Africa#Nigeria

References 
Nigerian government
 Federal Airports Authority of Nigeria (FAAN): List of airports owned and managed by FAAN
 Federal Ministry of Aviation, Nigeria
 Nigerian Airspace Management Agency
 Nigerian Civil Aviation Authority (NCAA)
Other
 
  - includes IATA codes
 Airports in Nigeria. World Aero Data.
 Airports in Nigeria. Great Circle Mapper.
 Airports in Nigeria. The Airport Guide.

Footnotes

 
Airports
Nigeria
Airports
Nigeria